Manatee High School is the oldest public high school in Bradenton, Florida, operated by the Manatee County School District.

History
Bradentown High School would open in 1897 located on what is now 15th Street West and Ballard Park Drive operating out of a wooden two-story building. A brick building which served as its replacement to the original building would be built in 1912. The original building became the Bradentown Intermediate School serving students from 3rd to 6th grade until closing in 1923 when a replacement was built for the intermediate school was built. After the new intermediate school was built it would be bought by Bradenton's municipal government and demolished. Sometime prior to 1915 students who lived in nearby Palmetto would start attending the school and it became known as Manatee County High School. Sometime during the 1920s it became known as Bradenton High School as a high school was created in Palmetto. 

The school would move to the site of where the Biltmore Grade School formerly operated at in 1930. The Biltmore Grade School was originally built in 1926 but closed one year later because of the collapse of the Florida Land Boom. The school's second location would end up becoming the Bradenton Junior High School in 1938 serving students in 7th to 9th grade before being made into the county school district administration offices in 1956 which served in that role until being demolished in 1989 when a new administration building was built. The building that formerly housed the Biltmore Grade School became known as the Davis Building after a longtime principal of the school, Paul F. Davis. Both Bradenton High School and Palmetto High School merged with each other in 1947 and the school would be renamed once again to Manatee County High School but ended up splitting again in 1959 with the school getting the name Manatee High School. Walker Junior High School which existed across the street from Manatee High School would be absorbed by Manatee High in 1969 as a part of the school district doing redistricting for desegregation. In 1997 a major redesign for the Davis Building that included new classrooms, a science-technology building, gym, and administration building was constructed. Most of Walker Junior High School be demolished in 1998 with only the western portion remaining. The Davis Building would be demolished in 2011 and replaced.

The Macohi 
The name for the school newspaper is derived from the school's former name, Manatee County High School, using the first two letters from each word to create "Macohi".  Currently in its 94th volume, the Macohi began as "The Oracle", while the yearbook was named the Macohi.  In 1990, the paper was awarded a Silver Crown Newspaper (for high schools) by the Columbia Scholastic Press Association.

Notable people

Alumni

Bill Anderson – former NFL tight end
Kelly Cassidy – congresswoman from Illinois
Demarcus Christmas – NFL defensive tackle for Seattle Seahawks
Ed Culpepper – former NFL player
Kathleen Flinn – author
Tommie Frazier – football player at Nebraska, member of College Football Hall of Fame
David Lawrence Jr. – journalist
Jill McCormick – former fashion model and philanthropist
Brian McRae – MLB center fielder
Alvoid Mays – former NFL player
Scott Makar former Florida Solicitor General.
Dan Miller – former congressman representing Florida's 13th congressional district
Chris Perez – MLB relief pitcher 
Ace Sanders – former NFL wide receiver for Jacksonville Jaguars
Deborah (Phillips) Smith (Ford) – lifestyle model, author, actress
Robby Stevenson – former kicker for Florida Gators
Richard Trapp – former AFL wide receiver prior to NFL merger
Willie Taggart – head coach for Florida Atlantic Owls football, former head coach of Florida State Seminoles football, Oregon Ducks football and South Florida Bulls football
Tyrone Williams – former NFL player

Staff

Former head football coach David Braine went on to become a college athletic director, most recently at Georgia Tech.
Former assistant football coach Danny Hope went on to become the head coach at Purdue.
Former assistant football coach Hootie Ingram went on to become athletic director at FSU.

Athletics 
Manatee High School athletic teams have won 16 FHSAA state championships. The following sports are available to students at Manatee:

Baseball (boys)
State champs – 1925, 1931, 1932, 1942 & 1963
Basketball (boys and girls)
Cheerleading (girls)
Competitive Cheerleading (girls)
State champs – 2013
Cross country (boys and girls)
Football (boys)
State champs – 1983, 1985, 1989, 1992 & 2011
Golf (boys and girls)
Soccer (boys and girls)
Softball (girls)
Swimming and diving (boys and girls)
Tennis (boys and girls)
Boys state champ – 1985
Track and Field (boys and girls)
Boys state champs – 1955–1957
Volleyball (girls)
Weightlifting (boys and girls)
Boys state champ – 1990
Wrestling (boys)

Flag Football (girls)

Hawkins Stadium
Manatee High School's sports venue is the Joe Kinnan Field at Hawkins Stadium. It is the home stadium for the Manatee Hurricanes, the school's football team.

References

External links 
Manatee High School website

Bradenton, Florida
High schools in Manatee County, Florida
Public high schools in Florida